The following lists events that happened during 1923 in the Belgian Congo.

Incumbents

 Governor General – Maurice Lippens, then Martin Rutten

Events

See also

 Belgian Congo
 History of the Democratic Republic of the Congo

References

Sources

 
Belgian Congo
Belgian Congo